32 Signal Regiment (Amalgamated from former 709 Communication Regiment and 700 Communication Squadron) is a Canadian Army primary reserve unit, part of the Royal Canadian Corps of Signals. It is the dedicated signals unit within 32 Canadian Brigade Group.

The regiment exercised its Freedom of the City in Toronto in 2017.

History
The regiment was established in Toronto in 1907 as the 2nd Signalling Company of the—then newly established—Signalling Corps. It employed semaphore flags, lamps, and heliographs. Telegraphy was still under the purview of the Canadian Engineers at the time, and as a result the 2nd Signalling Company had a detachment that paraded with the 2nd Engineer Company which was also based in Toronto.
After the advent of the First World War, thirty six signallers and officers were sent to Valcartier to join the 1st Canadian Divisional Signal Company. Wartime communications were made up of telephones, runners, telegraphy, and carrier pigeons. Radio use at the time was limited. In 1919, all of the units comprising the Canadian Corps Signal Service were disbanded in Toronto.

Squadrons
32 Signal Regiment is broken up into three squadrons. The regiment is divided between a detachment at Toronto's Fort York Armoury and at CFB Borden, with support elements in both locations.
 Headquarters and Support Squadron
 1 Squadron (Operational)
 2 Squadron (Training)

Training
The unit parades on Tuesdays between 7:00 p.m. and 10:30 p.m., year round. Military and occupational training occurs primarily in the summer, however some courses are done on a weekend basis. Enrollment in the Reserve Forces guarantees Full Time Summer Employment (FTSE) from May to August for the first four years of service.

References

Canadian Armed Forces
Military units and formations of Canada in World War II
Reserve forces of Canada